Valle Grande ("Great Valley" in Spanish) or Vallegrande may refer to:

 Valle Grande Department, one of the Departments of Argentina in Jujuy Province
 Valle Grande, Argentina, the capital city of Valle Grande Department
 Valle Grande, Lanzarote, in the Canary Islands
 Valle Grande, New Mexico, largest grass valley (valle) within the Valles Caldera of New Mexico, USA
 Vallegrande Province, Santa Cruz Department, Bolivia.
 Vallegrande Municipality, a municipality in the namesake province
 Vallegrande, the capital city of Vallegrande Province

See also 
 Valle Gran Rey, Spanish municipality
 Valle Grana, Italian valley
 Valley Grande, Alabama, American city
 Valle (disambiguation)
 Valgrind (disambiguation)